A Case for the Blues is a blues album by Katmandu, a British band made up of successful musicians from differing musical backgrounds, including Peter Green of Fleetwood Mac, Ray Dorset of Mungo Jerry and Vincent Crane of Atomic Rooster. Released in 1985, this was the only album by the band.

A Case for the Blues has been re-released several times, sometimes as a Peter Green solo album, such as the 1987 release on the Original Masters label. Other releases credit the album to Peter Green and Friends.

Track listing

Personnel
Peter Green – vocals, guitar, harmonica, drums
Ray Dorset – vocals, guitar, bass guitar, harmonica
Vincent Crane – keyboards
Len Surtees – bass guitar
Greg Terry-Short – drums
Jeff Whittaker – vocals, percussion, drums

References 

Peter Green (musician) albums
1985 debut albums